Giuseppe Gargani (born 23 April 1935 in Morra De Sanctis) is an Italian politician, a lawyer and from 1999 to 2009 a Member of the European Parliament,. He was elected on the Forza Italia ticket and sat with the European People's Party group. In the June 2009 elections Mr. Gargani came in 10th with 79,479 votes on the PdL list where only nine were elected.

He was chairman of the Avellino provincial administration (1970–1972). Subsequently he was a member of the Italian parliament until 1994 and was Under-Secretary-of-State at the Ministry of Justice (1979–1983).

On 23 July 2004 he was elected Chair of the Committee on Legal Affairs.

References

External links

1935 births
Living people
People from the Province of Avellino
Forza Italia MEPs
MEPs for Italy 2004–2009
MEPs for Italy 1999–2004